Września may refer to the following places:
Września in Greater Poland Voivodeship (west-central Poland)
Września, Masovian Voivodeship (east-central Poland)
Września, Świętokrzyskie Voivodeship (south-central Poland)